Claude King (February 5, 1923 – March 7, 2013) was an American country music singer and songwriter, best known for his million selling 1962 hit, "Wolverton Mountain".

Biography
King was born in Keithville in southern Caddo Parish south of Shreveport in northwestern Louisiana. At a young age, he was interested in music but also in athletics and the outdoors. He purchased a guitar at the age of twelve, and although he learned to play, most of his time was devoted to sports. He received a baseball scholarship to the University of Idaho at Moscow, Idaho.

From 1942 to 1945, he served in the United States Navy during World War II.

Music career
King formed a band with his friends Buddy Attaway and Tillman Franks called the Rainbow Boys. The trio played around Shreveport in their spare time while working an assortment of other jobs. He joined the Louisiana Hayride, a television and radio show produced at the Shreveport Municipal Auditorium and broadcast throughout the United States and in the United Kingdom. King was frequently on the same programs with Elvis Presley, Tex Ritter, Johnny Cash, Hank Williams, Webb Pierce, Kitty Wells, Jimmie Davis, Slim Whitman, Faron Young, Johnny Horton, Jim Reeves, George Jones, Tommy Tomlinson, and Lefty Frizzell.

King recorded a few songs for Gotham Records though none were successful. In 1961, he became more serious about a musical career and signed with the Nashville division of Columbia Records. He struck immediately, cutting "Big River, Big Man," both a country top 10 and a small pop crossover success. He soon followed with "The Comancheros" inspired by the John Wayne film of the same name It was a top 10 country hit in late 1961 and crossed over into the popular chart.

King released his best-known recording in the spring of 1962. "Wolverton Mountain," written with Nashville veteran Merle Kilgore, is based on a real character, Clifton Clowers, an uncle of Kilgore's who lived on Wolverton Mountain north of Morrilton, Arkansas. King and Kilgore agree that the original composition of the song lacked polish and that King eventually shaped the song into the hit that it became. According to long-time King guitarist, Robin Vosbury, Clowers came to numerous shows and asked everybody to call him "Uncle Clifton."  The song became an immediate hit. For nine weeks beginning on June 30, 1962, it ranked No. 1 on the Billboard country chart, on which it remained for a total of twenty-six weeks. It was also a Top 10 hit on the Billboard Hot 100.  Having sold more than one million copies, it was awarded gold disc status.

King followed up with a song about the 1864 battle of Atlanta in the Civil War. "The Burning Of Atlanta" also reached the Top 10 on the country chart and made the pop chart. In late 1962, King recorded "I've Got The World By The Tail," which narrowly missed the country Top 10.

In 1963, King scored three country hits with "Sheepskin Valley," "Building a Bridge," and "Hey Lucille!"  The hits continued in 1964 with "Sam Hill," and in 1965 he was back in the Top 10 with "Tiger Woman," co-written with Merle Kilgore. King did well that year with "Little Buddy." His smooth style continued to find favor throughout the decade, especially songs like "Catch a Little Raindrop" and the Top 10 hit, "All for the Love of A Girl" in 1969. His singles continued to make the country charts through 1972. He left the label in 1973 after twenty-nine hits.

In 1977, King recorded in some sessions for producer Howard A. Knight, Jr. On March 23 of that year he recorded "No Thanks Boys" which wasn't released. On the 25th he recorded and one of the tracks was "Cotton Dan". Other sessions that were produced by Knight were on April 26 and June 7 and 8.

Besides a career recording and touring, King performed as an actor in several movies. Along with his great-nephew, Chris Aable, King is among the few actors who are members in both the Screen Actors Guild and the American Society of Composers, Authors and Publishers. King had roles in several feature films, including 1971's Swamp Girl and 1972's Year of the Yahoo!.

In 1981, Governor Frank D. White of Arkansas paid tribute to King by declaring August 7 "Wolverton Mountain Day."

On June 3, 2003, King released a CD called Cowboy in the White House, co-produced with Robin Vosbury and Tillman Franks and released by Sun Records. Elvis Presley's guitarist, James Burton, also performs on the album.

On February 11, 2007, King was inducted into the Greater Shreveport Chamber of Commerce Walk of Stars. He joined other celebrities with strong ties to the Greater Shreveport area in this honor, including Terry Bradshaw, Kix Brooks, Johnnie Cochran, Tom Jarriel, Joe Ferguson, Eddie Robinson, Hal Sutton, and David Toms, as well as his musical colleagues, James Burton, Jim Reeves, Faron Young, Jimmie Davis, Chris Aable, Elvis Presley, and Tillman Franks.

King was a part of the "Magic Circle", which was a description of the ArkLaTex area coined by his longtime friend Tillman Franks, described as: "an area 50 miles in radius from downtown Shreveport. All kinds of music evolved from this Magic Circle.”

In 2011, King was named one of "Five Living Legends of Shreveport" by Danny Fox (1954–2014) of KWKH radio. Others named were Bob Griffin of KSLA and KTBS-TV, James Burton, Hank Williams, Jr., and Frank Page, who like King died in 2013.

Death
King died suddenly at his home in Shreveport on March 7, 2013, at the age of ninety. He is survived by his wife, the former Barbara Coco; three sons, Daune Coco King, Bradley T. King, and Jerome Jay King; along with one niece and three nephews, Barbara Watson, Joseph Brown, Mark Brown, and Chris Aable. He and his wife, Barbara, had just celebrated their 67th wedding anniversary a month prior to his death.

Services were held on March 13, 2013, at the Centuries Funeral Home Chapel in Shreveport, with the Reverend William D. "Billy" Franks and the Reverend Tim Maloy officiating. Interment followed at Centuries Memorial Park. Franks (born 1925) is the younger brother of Tillman Franks and the retired founding pastor of the Oakmont Church of God in the Cedar Grove section of Shreveport. He also preached at the funeral of Johnny Horton in November 1960.

Discography

Albums

Singles

A"Wolverton Mountain" peaked at No. 3 on Hot Adult Contemporary Tracks.

References

External links
Website

CMT
Discography

1923 births
2013 deaths
American country singer-songwriters
American male singer-songwriters
Columbia Records artists
Specialty Records artists
Musicians from Shreveport, Louisiana
University of Idaho alumni
United States Navy sailors
United States Navy personnel of World War II
Writers from Shreveport, Louisiana
American country guitarists
American male guitarists
Singer-songwriters from Louisiana
People from Keithville, Louisiana
Guitarists from Louisiana
20th-century American guitarists
Country musicians from Louisiana
20th-century American male musicians